The Cobble may refer to:

 The Cobble (Delaware County, New York)
 The Cobble (Schoharie County, New York)

See also